Ben Bolt-Palito Blanco High School is a public high school located in Ben Bolt (USA) and classified as a 2A school by the UIL.  It is part of the Ben Bolt-Palito Blanco Independent School District located in central Jim Wells County and serves the students of Ben Bolt, Palito Blanco, and the Green Acres area.  In 2013, the school was rated "Met Standard" by the Texas Education Agency.

The majority of Ben Bolt is in the BBPBISD district.

Athletics

State Finalists
Football 
1976(B)
Volleyball 
1979(1A)

References

External links
Ben Bolt - Palito Blanco ISD

Public high schools in Texas
Jim Wells County, Texas
Schools in Jim Wells County, Texas